Mere Humsafar is a 1970 Hindi-language romance film, produced by Yusuf Teendarwajawala under the Labela Films banner and directed by Dulal Guha. It stars Jeetendra and Sharmila Tagore , with music composed by Kalyanji Anandji.

Plot
The film begins in a village where Raju (Jeetendra) is a naughty slacker titled Junglee. After the death of his father, Raju is pestered by a native loan shark for his debt. So Raju determines to purchase a couple of bullocks for cultivation by procuring the required amount. So, he heads to Bombay by stowing in a truck where he gets acquainted with a runaway gypsy Tarna (Sharmila Tagore). During the travel, they fall in love, promise to help each other and couple up shortly. But they get separated. Tarna is aided by a film director Ashok (Balraj Sahni) one that turns her into top star Meenakshi. However, Raju associates with a ruffian Raigiya Dada (Suresh), and his sister Kusum (Laxmi Chhaya) seeks to sway him. A few months later, Raju spots Tarna as Meenakshi and runs to meet her when Ashok claims her as his wife and a bewildered Raju steps aside. Being aware of Raju's arrival, Tarna rushes but she is stalled by Ashok due to the ongoing situations. Right now, forlorn Raju decides to quit when, unfortunately, Raigiya Dada faces a major accident and is amputated. Here, Raju promises to marry Kusum in gratitude, but she is molested and killed by a goon Chanchal. Knowing it, Raju flares up on the blackguard, is caught by police when Ashok acquits and makes him realize the virtue of Tarna. Meanwhile, Tarna renounces her profession, surrenders the wealth to producers, and accompanies Raju. Thereupon, Ashok gifts them a couple of bullocks. Finally, the movie ends on a happy note with Raju and Tarna proceeding towards the village.

Cast
Jeetendra as Raju "Junglee"
Sharmila Tagore as Tarna / Meenakshi
Balraj Sahni as Ashok
Laxmi Chhaya as Kusum
Suresh as Raigiya Dada
Jagdeep as a Truck cleaner
Jeevan as Mittal
Suresh as  Shambu Dada
Ramayan Tiwari as Ustad Anwar
Keshto Mukherjee as Abdul Narayan D'Souza
Shammi as Suzie
Mohan Sherry
Gopal Sehgal as a film director

Soundtrack

All the songs were penned by Anand Bakshi, songs were composed by Kalyanji Anandji and Kamal Rajasthani.

References

External links
 

1970 films
1970s Hindi-language films
1970s romance films
Films scored by Kalyanji Anandji
Films directed by Dulal Guha
Indian romance films
Hindi-language romance films